The Jamaica Fed Cup team represents Jamaica in Fed Cup tennis competition and are governed by Tennis Jamaica.  They have not competed since 2004.

History
Jamaica competed in its first Fed Cup in 1976.  Their best result was reaching the 32-team main draw in 1987.

See also
Fed Cup
Jamaica Davis Cup team

External links

Billie Jean King Cup teams
Fed Cup
Women's national sports teams of Jamaica